Fiona Ruth Gibson (born 1970) is a British Anglican priest. Since 2021, she has been the Archdeacon of Ludlow in the Church of England's Diocese of Hereford.

Biography
Gibson studied at Homerton College, Cambridge, graduating with a Bachelor of Education (BEd) degree in 1993. She then worked as a teacher, before training for ordination at Oak Hill Theological College. Having completed a Master of Theology (MTh) degree, she was ordained in the Church of England as a deacon in 2011 and as a priest in 2012. After a curacy in Bedford, she was Vicar of Cople from 2014 until her appointment as archdeacon. She was collated as Archdeacon of Ludlow on 25 April 2021.

Gibson is an evangelical Anglican. She is a former member of the council of Oak Hill College, a conservative evangelical theological college, and vice chair of The Junia Network, a group for evangelical Anglican female clergy.

Gibson is married to Dave, and together they have two children.

Notes

1970 births
Alumni of Homerton College, Cambridge
Archdeacons of Ludlow
Living people
21st-century Anglican priests
Evangelical Anglican clergy
Alumni of Oak Hill College